Good Side, Bad Side is the eleventh studio album by American rapper Master P released on March 23, 2004 on The New No Limit Records and Koch Records. The production was handled by Master P, who also collaborated with other executive producers, alongside  Lil Jon , DJ Daryl, Donald XL Robertson and Myke Diesel. It marked Master P's return to his independent roots.

Background
After the New No Limit's deal with Universal Records expired a year earlier, P signed his company to a partnership with the independent Koch Records. Good Side, Bad Side was a moderate success. The double-disc album debuted at number 22 on the US Billboard 200 with nearly 42,135 copies sold in its first week in sales. Debuting on the charts in March 2004, it was Master P's highest position on the chart since his 1999 album Only God Can Judge Me debuted at number two.

Track listing

Personnel

Main performers 

 Master P

Featured guest 

 Lil Jon
 Silkk the Shocker
 Curren$y
 C-Murder
 Lil Romeo
  Liberty
  Vellqwan
  Afficial 
  Theresa Esclovon
  Djuan Baham
  Souya

Charts

Weekly charts

Year-end charts

References

Master P albums
2004 albums
No Limit Records albums